Stefan Szefer (also known as Steve Shafer or Shaffer) (born May 8, 1942 in Poland) is a former Polish American soccer defender.  He earned six caps during his career, three with Poland and three with the United States.

Club career
Most sources for Szefer’s early career are in Polish. In 1964, he was with Śląsk Wrocław.  He then played for ŁKS Łódź from 1966 to 1968.  In 1968, Szefer moved to the Chicago Mustangs of the North American Soccer League.  The Mustangs folded at the end of the season.  He then moved to Dutch club MVV Maastricht for two seasons, scoring two goals as a left back.  In 1971, Szefer moved back to Chicago where he played for two amateur teams, Chicago Wisla (1971-1973) and the Ukrainian Lions (1973-1975).  In 1975, he signed with the expansion Chicago Sting of the NASL.  In May 1976, Szefer joined the Chicago Cats of the American Soccer League, but returned to the Sting for the 1977 season.  Szefer played outdoor for the Sting until 1979.  He returned briefly in 1980 to play for them during the 1980-1981 NASL indoor season.

International career

Poland
Szefer played three games for the Poland from 1966 to 1967.  He also played for Poland in the 1968 European Championship.

United States
In 1973, Szefer played for the U.S. under the name Steve Shafer. The first game was a 2-0 win over Canada on August 5.  Five days later, he played in a 4-0 loss to Poland.  On August 12, he played his last game with the U.S.,  a 1-0 win over Poland.  He was replaced by Jerry Panek in the 60th minute.

References

External links
 NASL stats
 Stefan Szefer at elfvoetbal.nl 

1942 births
American soccer players
American Soccer League (1933–1983) players
Association football defenders
Chicago Cats players
Chicago Mustangs (1967–68) players
Chicago Sting (NASL) players
Dual internationalists (football)
Living people
ŁKS Łódź players
MVV Maastricht players
Eredivisie players
Expatriate footballers in the Netherlands
North American Soccer League (1968–1984) players
North American Soccer League (1968–1984) indoor players
Polish footballers
Polish expatriate footballers
Polish emigrants to the United States
Poland international footballers
Śląsk Wrocław players
Ukrainian Lions players
United States men's international soccer players
Place of birth missing (living people)